Sergey Yuryevich Gomolyako (born January 19, 1970, in Chelyabinsk, RSFSR, USSR) is a Russian former  professional ice hockey player. He played as a forward.

He was part of the Soviet national team that won the 1989 World Junior Ice Hockey Championships. He also won back-to-back European Hockey League titles with Metallurg Magnitogorsk in 1998–99 and 1999–2000.
For his accomplishments, he was given the title of Master of Sports, International Class, by his native country.

During his playing days, Gomolyako's skills were often contrasted with his unusual, rotund physique, which was the product of chronic metabolic issues rather than poor conditioning.

Since 2006, he has been working as a coach.

Career statistics

References

External links
 

Living people
1970 births
Sportspeople from Chelyabinsk
Soviet ice hockey forwards
Russian ice hockey forwards
HC Mechel players
Traktor Chelyabinsk players
Metallurg Magnitogorsk players
HC Lada Togliatti players
Severstal Cherepovets players
HC Khimik Voskresensk players
Salavat Yulaev Ufa players
Russian ice hockey coaches
Calgary Flames draft picks